The Law of Cyber-Space is a book by Ahmad Kamal, Senior Fellow at the United Nations Institute for Training and Research on the subject of cyber law.

As is explained in its foreword, the book is a sequel to the earlier work on “Information Insecurity” published in 2002, in which it had been pointed out that the absence of globally harmonised legislation was turning cyber-space into an area of ever increasing dangers and worries.

The book lays down the possible parameters for a law of cyberspace and argues in favour of starting negotiations with the full participation of the three concerned stake-holders, namely governments, the private sector, and civil society.

Kamal believes that, in many ways, the current situation in cyberspace is similar to the problems once faced on the open ocean, where the absence of any jurisdiction or consensus legislation had also created a lawless situation. The international community finally woke up to the challenge and started negotiations on the Law of the Sea. Those negotiations went on for almost a decade before they succeeded and Kamal writes that the world is much better off as a result. 

Kamal asserts that in the case of cyber-space the challenge appears to be far greater:

See also

Internet and Technology Law Desk Reference

External links
The full text of The Law of Cyber-Space is also available for free download from the UN Permanent Missions

2005 non-fiction books
Law books
Books about the Internet
Cyberspace
Works about computer law